Henry Trengove or Nance (by 1521 – November 1561), of Nance in Illogan, Cornwall, was a Cornish politician.

He was a Member (MP) of the Parliament of England for Helston, Cornwall in October 1553.

References

1561 deaths
People from Illogan
Members of the pre-1707 English Parliament for constituencies in Cornwall
Year of birth uncertain
English MPs 1553 (Mary I)